Jacek Szmatka (28 March 1950 – 20 October 2001) was a Polish sociologist. Professor the Jagiellonian University, visiting professor in a number of American universities  State University of New York (Buffalo), Stanford University (Stanford), University of Washington (Seattle), University of South Carolina (Columbia).

He was a member of the International Advisory Editors of Encyclopedia of Sociology, and the author of two books and a number of sociological articles.

External links
Jacek Szmatka (1950–2001)

1950 births
2001 deaths
Deaths from cancer in Ohio
Polish sociologists